St. Joseph's Church is a Catholic church situated on Church Road in the East Wall area of Dublin, Ireland.

History
Originally this area was part of St Laurence O'Toole Parish, North Wall, in the diocese of Dublin. From 1919 there was a church known as the 'Tin Church' on Church Road, at a site opposite Seaview Avenue. In 1941 this became the parish church of the newly constituted parish of East Wall. This building is now a gym.

In 1954 it was decided to build a new, bigger church, the present St Joseph's Church, at the junction of Church Road and St Mary's Road. The Foundation Stone was blessed on 8 November 1954, and on 29 July 1956 the then Archbishop John Charles McQuaid blessed and officially opened the new Church of St Joseph in East Wall.

Changes and development
St Joseph's church has seen significant changes since it was built. Many of these changes are reflected in work that has been carried out on the church building over the years. The Sanctuary was reordered. This enables the priest to celebrate Mass facing the people. The reordered Sanctuary is a much bigger space and facilitates the active involvement of lay people.

References

External links
 St Joseph's Church http://www.stjosephschurcheastwall.ie
 Dublin Diocese Information http://www.dublindiocese.ie/parish/east-wall/

Roman Catholic churches in Dublin (city)
Churches of the Roman Catholic Archdiocese of Dublin